Stanisław Kozera (born 27 January 1943 in Trzebnica) is a retired Polish Olympic coxswain.

References

1943 births
Living people
Polish male rowers
Rowers at the 1964 Summer Olympics
Olympic rowers of Poland
People from Trzebnica
Sportspeople from Lower Silesian Voivodeship
Coxswains (rowing)
European Rowing Championships medalists